William Johnson (c. 1660 - 1718)  of Blackwall, Middlesex, and Mandeville's Manor, Sternfield, Aldeburgh, Suffolk, was an English merchant, shipbuilder and Tory politician who sat in the English and British House of Commons for 29 years from 1689 to 1718

Early life
Johnson was the second son of Sir Henry Johnson  and his wife Dorothy Lord, daughter of William Lord of Melton, Kent. He was educated at Leyden in 1678. He went  to Bengal as a factor for the East India Company and sometime after 1683, he returned to England and established himself as a merchant, trading to Africa and the Peninsula. He bought  Mandeville's Manor, Sternfield, near Aldeburgh,  but lived mainly  near the shipyard inherited by his brother Henry at Blackwall. By 1687, he married Agneta Baron, daughter of Hartgill Baron, clerk of the privy seal, of Windsor, Berkshire.

Career
From 1687 to 1689 Johnson was an Assistant of the Royal African Company.  At the 1689 English general election, he was returned as Tory  Member of Parliament for Aldeburgh on the  interest of his brother Henry. Also in 1689, he was appointed Commissioner for assessment, for Middlesex, Suffolk and Aldeburgh to 1690, and Deputy Lieutenant for Tower Hamlets at least to 1702.  He was not active in the Convention Parliament, but served on six committees including one to consider the management of the East India trade, one for the bill for restoring corporations, and one on a petition from the Royal Africa Company.

Johnson was returned for Aldeburgh in a contest at the 1690 English general election. On 2 April 1690 he was appointed to draft a bill to regulate the East India trade. He was appointed a Gentleman of the privy chamber from  1690 to 1702. He was also a committee member of the East India Company from 1690 to 1691. With his brother, Sir Henry, he was part of a syndicate that from 1691 to 1694 tried unsuccessfully to challenge  the East India Company's monopoly. He was returned unopposed for Aldeburgh at the 1695 English general election and was appointed on 20 February  to prepare a bill to regulate the East India Company. He signed the Association in February, and in March voted against fixing the price of guineas at 22 shillings. On 25 November 1696, he voted against the attainder of Sir John Fenwick.  With  his brother, he returned to the East India Company, and was committee member from 1698 to 1699.

At the 1698 English general election, Johnson and his brother both stood at Aldeburgh, where they were returned unopposed again, and he stood on his own at Orford, where he was defeated. He petitioned, and then in February 1700, he went on a long voyage to the East Indies and China. The petition was finally declared in his favour after the dissolution of Parliament. From  the  first general election of 1701, he stood only at Aldeburgh, where he was returned unopposed  then and in the second general election of that year. As a Tory, he  supported the motion of 26 February 1702 to vindicate the Commons’ proceedings over the impeachment of the Whig  ministers in the previous session. He was committee member of the East India Company again  from 1702 to 1705.

Johnson's brother Henry having inherited their father's ship building yard at Blackwall, ran it using a succession  of managers. By 1704 William Johnson was running of the business, and between 1704 and 1710  built five ships-of-the-line and six other vessels there. He was living in the house in the yard from at least 1705, and probably lived there over a longer period. In 1709 he became an Elder Brother of  Trinity House for the rest of his life.

Johnson was returned unopposed at the 1705 English general election and was absent from the vote on the Speaker on 25 October 1705. He was returned as usual as a Tory at the  1708 British general election and voted against the impeachment of Dr Sacheverell in 1710.  After the 1710 British general election he  was listed  among the ‘Tory patriots’ who opposed the continuation of the war, and the ‘worthy patriots’ who exposed the mismanagements of the previous ministry. He was appointed Commissioner for sewers for Tower Hamlets in  1712.

At the 1715 British general election Johnson was returned for Aldeburgh for the last time. He voted against the septennial bill. In 1716, he took the post of governor of Guinea (Gold Coast)  under the Royal African Company, and sailed soon after 16 December 1716

Death and legacy
Johnson  was reported to have died at Cape Coast Castle in November 1718. He and his wife had three sons and nine daughters.  All his property was to be sold, and the proceeds divided equally among the surviving members of his family, except for his one married daughter.

References

 

1660s births
1718 deaths
People from Aldeburgh
English MPs 1689–1690
English MPs 1690–1695
English MPs 1695–1698
English MPs 1698–1700
English MPs 1701
English MPs 1701–1702
English MPs 1702–1705
English MPs 1705–1707
British MPs 1707–1708
British MPs 1708–1710
British MPs 1710–1713
British MPs 1713–1715
British MPs 1715–1722
Members of the Parliament of Great Britain for English constituencies
British businesspeople in shipping
British shipbuilders